Jonnie Lowe (born 1 October 1979) is a Honduran track and field athlete who competes in the 400 metres and 400 metres hurdles. Lowe is most known for setting the Honduran record in the 400 m hurdles with a time of 51.77 in Managua, Nicaragua.

References

1979 births
Living people
Honduran male sprinters
Honduran male hurdlers
Olympic male sprinters
Olympic athletes of Honduras
Athletes (track and field) at the 2004 Summer Olympics
Athletes (track and field) at the 2003 Pan American Games
Athletes (track and field) at the 2007 Pan American Games
Pan American Games competitors for Honduras
Central American Games gold medalists for Honduras
Central American Games medalists in athletics